Yelena Antonova is a road cyclist from Kazakhstan. She represented her nation at the 2011 UCI Road World Championships.

References

External links
 profile at Procyclingstats.com

1971 births
Kazakhstani female cyclists
Living people
Place of birth missing (living people)
Cyclists at the 2010 Asian Games
Asian Games competitors for Kazakhstan